Italy competed at the 1928 Summer Olympics in Amsterdam, Netherlands. 174 competitors, 156 men and 18 women, took part in 81 events in 15 sports.

Medalists

Athletics

Results

Boxing

Men's Flyweight (– 50.8 kg)
 Carlo Covagnioli →  Bronze Medal
 First Round — Bye
 Second Round — Defeated Robert Sartos (BEL), points
 Quarterfinals — Defeated Alfredo Gaona (MEX), points
 Semifinals — Lost to Antal Kocsis (HUN), points
 Third Place Match — Defeated Baddie Lebanon (RSA), points

Men's Light Heavyweight (– 79.4 kg)
 Domenico Ceccerelli
 First Round — Lost to Donald McCorkindale (RSA), points

Cycling

12 cyclists, all men, represented Italy in 1928.

Individual road race
 Allegro Grandi
 Michele Orecchia
 Ambrogio Beretta
 Marcello Neri

Team road race
 Allegro Grandi
 Michele Orecchia
 Ambrogio Beretta
 Marcello Neri

Sprint
 Edoardo Severgnini

Time trial
 Angelo Cattaneo

Tandem
 Francesco Malatesta
 Adolfo Corsi

Team pursuit
 Luigi Tasselli
 Giacomo Gaioni
 Cesare Facciani
 Mario Lusiani

Diving

Equestrian

Fencing

18 fencers, all men, represented Italy in 1928.

Men's foil
 Giulio Gaudini
 Oreste Puliti
 Ugo Pignotti

Men's team foil
 Ugo Pignotti, Giulio Gaudini, Giorgio Pessina, Gioacchino Guaragna, Oreste Puliti, Giorgio Chiavacci

Men's team épée
 Giulio Basletta, Marcello Bertinetti, Giancarlo Cornaggia-Medici, Carlo Agostoni, Renzo Minoli, Franco Riccardi

Men's sabre
 Bino Bini
 Gustavo Marzi
 Arturo De Vecchi

Men's team sabre
 Bino Bini, Oreste Puliti, Giulio Sarrocchi, Renato Anselmi, Emilio Salafia, Gustavo Marzi

Football

Round of 16

Quarter-finals

Semi-finals

Bronze medal match

Gymnastics

Modern pentathlon

Three male pentathletes represented Italy in 1928.

 Eugenio Pagnini
 Luigi Petrillo
 Carlo Simonetti

Rowing

Sailing

Swimming

Weightlifting

Wrestling

Art competitions

References

External links
Official Olympic Reports
International Olympic Committee results database
 

Nations at the 1928 Summer Olympics
1928
1928 in Italian sport